The Branham House is residential dwelling located in the South Broadway Neighborhood Historic District in Georgetown, Kentucky. The property was individually listed on the U.S. National Register of Historic Places in 1973.

It is the oldest house in the City of Georgetown, which was incorporated in 1790, and was probably built in the 1790s.  It is a two-story three-bay brick house, on a stone foundation, with some frame elements.  Its Greek Revival front portico was added later.

References

National Register of Historic Places in Scott County, Kentucky
Houses completed in 1795
Houses in Georgetown, Kentucky
Houses on the National Register of Historic Places in Kentucky
1795 establishments in Kentucky
Greek Revival houses in Kentucky
Individually listed contributing properties to historic districts on the National Register in Kentucky